Lucrinus is a monotypic genus of African dwarf spiders containing the single species, Lucrinus putus. It was first described by Octavius Pickard-Cambridge in 1904, and has only been found in South Africa.

See also
 List of Linyphiidae species (I–P)

References

Linyphiidae
Monotypic Araneomorphae genera
Spiders of South Africa
Taxa named by Octavius Pickard-Cambridge